
Gmina Szypliszki, is a rural gmina (administrative district) in Suwałki County, Podlaskie Voivodeship, in north-eastern Poland, on the Lithuanian border.

Villages
Gmina Szypliszki contains the villages and settlements of: 
 
 Adamowizna
 Aleksandrówka
 Andrzejewo
 Becejły
 Białobłota
 Bilwinowo
 Budzisko
 Czerwonka
 Dębniak
 Dębowo
 Deksznie
 Fornetka
 Głęboki Rów
 Grauże Stare
 Jasionowo
 Jegliniec
 Jeziorki
 Kaletnik
 Klonorejść
 Kociołki
 Krzywólka
 Kupowo-Folwark
 Lipniak
 Lipowo
 Łowocie
 Majdan
 Mikołajówka
 Nowe Grauże
 Olszanka
 Podwojponie
 Pokomsze
 Polule
 Postawelek
 Przejma Mała
 Przejma Wielka
 Przejma Wysoka
 Romaniuki
 Rybalnia
 Sadzawki
 Sitkowizna
 Słobódka
 Szelment
 Szury
 Szymanowizna
 Szypliszki
 Węgielnia
 Wesołowo
 Wiatrołuża Druga
 Wojponie
 Wygorzel
 Zaboryszki
 Żubryn
 Żyrwiny

Neighbouring gminas
Gmina Szypliszki is bordered by the city of Suwałki and by the gminas of Jeleniewo, Krasnopol, Puńsk, Rutka-Tartak and Suwałki. It also borders Lithuania.

References
Polish official population figures 2006

Szypliszki
Suwałki County